State Highway 75 (SH 75) is a  state highway in the U.S. state of Texas. It follows the former routing of U.S. Route 75 (US 75), which was supplanted by Interstate 45 south of Dallas, except in Dallas, where the former US 75 is now SH 310, and through Ferris, Palmer, Ennis, and Corsicana, where the old highway is signed as a business route of I-45. The route was designated in 1987.

Route description
The southern terminus of the route is in Conroe, where it merges into Interstate 45 at the southern side of Loop 336. The northern terminus is approximately three miles north of Streetman, in the southern section of Navarro County, where it becomes the east side frontage road for I-45.

Previous routes
SH 75 was previously designated on August 21, 1923 to replace SH 13A from Goodnight east to the Oklahoma border. On May 19, 1924, the section from Goodnight to Jericho was cancelled. SH 75 was instead extended west to Washburn. By 1927 it was running concurrently with the newly designated U.S. Highway 66, and was cancelled on September 26, 1939. The current route was designated on January 28, 1987, replacing part of US 75 which was decommissioned south of Dallas.

Related routes
North of Dallas, US 75 was rerouted onto Central Expressway, one of the first expressway projects in the United States, in the 1950s.  Its original route from Richardson to Howe (south of Sherman) was redesignated as State Highway 5.

Junction list

References

075
75
Conroe, Texas
Transportation in Montgomery County, Texas
Transportation in Walker County, Texas
Transportation in Madison County, Texas
Transportation in Leon County, Texas
Transportation in Freestone County, Texas